"Flashback" is the 44th episode of the American science fiction television series Star Trek: Voyager airing on the UPN network. It is the second episode of the third season.

The series follows the adventures of the Federation starship Voyager during its journey home to Earth, having been stranded tens of thousands of light-years away. In this episode, Captain Janeway must help Lt. Tuvok delve into his past to understand a memory triggered by the sight of a spatial phenomenon.

This episode was produced along with Star Trek: Deep Space Nines "Trials and Tribble-ations" as part of the Star Trek franchise's 30th anniversary. It features characters from Star Trek: The Original Series: Hikaru Sulu (George Takei) and Janice Rand (Grace Lee Whitney). Both characters appear by means of a flashback by Tuvok, taking place during the events depicted in the film Star Trek VI: The Undiscovered Country.

The episode was premiered the evening of August 9, 1996, at a convention held at the Britannia Hotel in Birmingham City Centre. The presentation was played from VHS tape.

Plot
As Voyager monitors a nebula with large quantities of the power source sirillium, Tuvok finds his hands shaking, and requests permission to go to sickbay. En route, he experiences a flashback that involves him trying to pull a young girl off a cliff to safety. The girl ends up falling, horrifying young Tuvok. Eventually, he arrives in sickbay, and collapses, convulsing on the floor.

In sickbay, Tuvok describes the memory, but insists the events he "remembered" never occurred. With no clear cause of his symptoms, he is dismissed with a device to monitor his readings in case such an event occurs again. That night, he attempts to build a "structure of harmony" in an effort to aid his meditation, but cannot stop the structure from collapsing. After a visit from Kes, he attempts again.

The next morning, he notes he had spent fourteen hours meditating, and still had no idea what the cause of the problem was. Ensign Kim could not find anything unusual with the nebula they were near, but Tuvok suggests they scan it for Klingon activity. B'Elanna Torres reminds him that the Klingon Empire is on the other side of the galaxy. Moments later, Tuvok sees the mental image again, and collapses once more.

In sickbay, the Doctor suggests the problem is a repressed memory, which in Vulcans can cause brain damage due to the conflict between the conscious and unconscious minds. The only possible course of action is to initiate a mind meld – normally undertaken with a family member. Tuvok explains he would go to one of the Vulcans on board but he feels Janeway is the best choice to assist him in locating and reintegrating the memory. During the meld she would be an outside observer of the memories, unnoticed by anyone but Tuvok.

When Tuvok initiates the mind meld, he attempts to take them to the cliff in his memory, but instead they appear on the USS Excelsior, under attack by the Klingons. Explaining the attack, the memory moves once more, to three days before, when Praxis exploded. After learning about how Captain Kirk and Dr. McCoy were placed on trial for the assassination of the Klingon Chancellor, Captain Sulu attempted a rescue mission, which Tuvok was the only Excelsior crew member to protest.

In an effort to avoid confrontation with the Klingons, Sulu ordered an approach path through a nebula remarkably similar to the one Voyager was observing in the Delta Quadrant – the appearance causing Tuvok to recall the repressed memory once more, breaking the mind meld.

After a period of recovery for Tuvok, during which Janeway and Kim comment on the differences between Starfleet of the 23rd century and the 24th, they try the mind meld again – appearing once more on the Excelsior. After a discussion about Tuvok's motivations for joining Starfleet, a small Klingon attack began. After Sulu claimed their navigational equipment had malfunctioned, Kang insisted upon escorting the Excelsior back to Federation space, to help them from getting lost again. Sulu agreed, but on the way out of the nebula they were in, came up with a plan to disable the Klingon ship by igniting the sirillium that was also present in that nebula. After this succeeded, they set course once more for Qo'noS, before being attacked again by three Klingon battlecruisers – an attack that killed Lieutenant Dimitri Valtane. As Tuvok watched Valtane die, the memory appeared once more, and in sickbay, the neural engrams destabilize, preventing the meld from being broken. On the Excelsior, Sulu could suddenly see Janeway, who was supposed to merely be an observer. In an effort to blend into the memories, Tuvok takes Janeway to a time where she can steal Commander Janice Rand's uniform. In sickbay, the Doctor and Kes notice an irregularity in the memories, and deduced they were not in fact memories, but instead a virus. Using thoron radiation, they begin to kill the virus.

On the Excelsior, the attack occurs once more, and Valtane dies when a plasma conduit behind his console explodes. The image of the girl on the cliff appears, but this time, it is Janeway who is letting the girl fall. As the Doctor continues the efforts to kill the virus, it tracks back, changing to Valtane, and then an endless stream of other children. Eventually, it dies, and Tuvok breaks the meld.

In sickbay, the Doctor and Kes explain what must have happened: the virus thrived on neural peptides, and hid itself by creating the false memory that the person bearing it would repress, so the virus could live in secret, and migrate from person to person as its hosts died.

Walking down a corridor, Janeway suggests that Tuvok missed those days, a suggestion Tuvok rejects. However, he admits that he is pleased to have been a part of them, and having experienced the memories, Janeway says she feels she was a part of them as well. As a result, Tuvok suggests that she could feel nostalgic for the both of them.

Casting 
This episode features The Original Series actors George Takei, Michael Ansara and Grace Lee Whitney.

Production 
In an example of discontinuity, the character of Lieutenant Dimitri Valtane, who appears in both this Voyager episode shot in 1996 and the 1991 feature film Star Trek VI: The Undiscovered Country, is shown to still be alive at the end of the feature film, in direct contradiction with the episode's depiction of events. Valtane is shown to have died in "Flashback", prior to the feature film's concluding scene in which the USS Excelsior captain and crew bid farewell to the USS Enterprise crew.

Reception
In 2015, a Star Trek: Voyager binge-watching guide by W.I.R.E.D. suggested this episode could not be skipped.

In 2016, The Hollywood Reporter rated "Flashback" the 86th best episode of all Star Trek episodes.  In 2017, Den of Geek included this on their abbreviated watch guide for Star Trek: Voyager, picking out this episode on their cross-overs roadmap, noting The Original Series characters Hikaru Sulu, Kang and Janice Rand.

This episode may have been a response to the rumor mill's reports that fans might see a series following Sulu as he commands USS Excelsior, a ship that was previously featured in the film Star Trek VI: The Undiscovered Country (1991).

In 2017, Den of Geek noted this episode on their Star Trek: Voyager watching guide, pointing out this episode for its connections to other media in the Star Trek universe.

In July 2019, Screen Rant ranked "Flashback" as one of the top five episodes of the series. They note that this episode focuses on Tuvok's memories of his time in Starfleet aboard the USS Excelsior starship. They also point out this episode was released for the 30th anniversary celebrations for the Star Trek franchise (1966-1996).

In 2021, The Digital Fix said that it was appealing to see Takei reprise his character Sulu in this episode for the 30th anniversary.

Novelization 
A novel version of "Flashback" was written by Diane Carey, based on the Brannon Braga screenplay.

Releases 
The episode was premiered at the fan-run not-for-profit UK convention "Delta Quadrant" held at the Britannia Hotel in Birmingham City Centre in August 1996. The episode was first shown during the evening of August 9, 1996, from a VHS video cassette in the care of the convention's organiser Bob Hollocks.

"Flashback" was released on LaserDisc in Japan on June 25, 1999, as part of the 3rd season vol.1 set.

This episode was released with "Basics, Part II" on VHS in the United Kingdom, on one cassette, Star Trek: Voyager 3.1 - Basics, Part II/Flashback.

"Flashback" was released on DVD on July 6, 2004, as part of Star Trek Voyager: Complete Third Season, with Dolby 5.1 surround audio.

Notes

References

External links

 

 "Flashback" reviewed in the New York Times
 "Flashback" reviewed in the New York Daily News 

Star Trek: Voyager (season 3) episodes
1996 American television episodes
Anniversary television episodes
Television episodes directed by David Livingston
Television episodes written by Brannon Braga